Ockham and Wisley Commons is a  biological Site of Special Scientific Interest east of Woking in Surrey. It is also a Local Nature Reserve and part of the Thames Basin Heaths Special Protection Area. It is part of the slightly larger area of  Wisley & Ockham Commons & Chatley Heath nature reserve, which is owned by Surrey County Council and managed by the Surrey Wildlife Trust.

This site is mainly heathland but it also has areas of open water, bog, woodland and scrub. It has a rich flora and it is of national importance for true flies and for dragonflies and damselflies. Rare species include the white-faced darter dragonfly and the Thyridanthrax fenestratus bee fly.

There is public access to the site.

References

Local Nature Reserves in Surrey
Surrey Wildlife Trust
Sites of Special Scientific Interest in Surrey
Wisley